Roman Kuzyk (born 7 June 1989 in Ukraine) is a professional Ukrainian football defender.

Career
He played for Ukrainian Premier League club FC Karpaty Lviv. He is the product of the FC Karpaty Lviv youth team school system.

External links 
Website Karpaty Profile
Profile on EUFO
Profile on Football Squads

1989 births
Living people
Ukrainian footballers
FC Karpaty-2 Lviv players
Association football defenders